The burnt-necked eremomela (Eremomela usticollis) is a species of bird formerly placed in the "Old World warbler" assemblage, but now placed in the family Cisticolidae.  It is found in Angola, Botswana, Eswatini, Malawi, Mozambique, Namibia, South Africa, Zambia, and Zimbabwe. Its natural habitats are subtropical or tropical dry forests, dry savannah, and subtropical or tropical dry shrubland.

References

External links
 Burnt-necked eremomela - Species text in The Atlas of Southern African Birds.

burnt-necked eremomela
Birds of Southern Africa
burnt-necked eremomela
Taxonomy articles created by Polbot